The Controller of Storekeepers Accounts also known as the Comptroller of Storekeepers Accounts  was a principal member of the Navy Board who was responsible for managing and processing all naval store-keeping accounts and deliveries to naval yards from 1671 to 1796 he was based in the Navy Office he superintended the Office for Examining Storekeepers Accounts.

History
The post was created in 1671, the Controller of Storekeeper Accounts department was responsible for examining all Naval Stores delivered to various storekeepers at all naval yards, in addition to auditing all their accounts. From 1796 the post was abolished and the work of this office was co-ordinated to some extent by the Navy Board's Committee of Accounts, which itself was replaced for the last few years of the Board's existence in 1832 by the Accountant-General who was one of the principal officers of the Board. In 1796 a new stores department was created from the responsibilities of the former controller of storekeepers.

List of controllers
Included:
 Sir John Ernle, 23 June 1671 - 29 April 1680
 Sir Anthony Deane, 30 April 1680 - 30 July 1680. 
 Phineas. Pett, 31 July 1680 - 11 October 1688. (Phineas lived 1635-94. He was the son Peter Pett of Deptford.)
 Sir William. Booth, 12 October 1688 - 21 April 1689
 Henry Priestman, 22 April 1689 - 10 July 1690
 Sir John Ashby, 11 July 1690 - 25 June 1693
 Thomas. Wilshaw, 26 June 1693 - 26 October 1702
 Henry. Greenhill, 27 October 1702 - 1 February 1705
 Thomas. Jennings, 2 February 1705 - 15 November 1714
 Charles Cornewall, 16 November  1714 - 7 August 1716
 Thomas. Swanton, 8 August 1716 - 22 April 1718
 William Clevland, 23 April 1718 - 23 May 1732
 Hon. Robert. Byng,  24 May 1732 - 28 May 1739
 John. Phillipson, 29 May 1739 - 20 March 1741
 George. Crowle, 21 March 1741 - 17 March 1752
 Richard. Hall 18 March 1752 - 9 November 1753
 George. Adams, 10 November 1753 - 19 March 1761
 Hon. William. H. Bateman, 20 March 1761 - 6 July 1783
 William. Campbell, 7 July 1783 - 20 January 1790
 Sir William Bellingham, 21 January 1790 - 1792
 Sir Frederick Rogers, 1793-1796

References

Sources
 Office-Holders in Modern Britain: Volume 7, Navy Board Officials 1660-1832, ed. J M Collinge (London, 1978), British History Online http://www.british-history.ac.uk/office-holders/vol7 [accessed 25 March 2017].

External links

S